Cosmopterix nonna is a moth in the family Cosmopterigidae. It was described by John Frederick Gates Clarke in 1986. It is found on the Marquesas Islands.

References

Natural History Museum Lepidoptera generic names catalog

Moths described in 1986
nonna